Harpalus caiphus is a species of ground beetle in the subfamily Harpalinae. It was described by Reiche & Saulcy in 1855.

References

caiphus
Beetles described in 1855